Macon Township is a township in Harvey County, Kansas, United States.  As of the 2000 census, its population was 1,056.

Geography
According to the USGS, it contains two cemeteries: Restlawn Garden of Memory and Royer. The streams of Dry Creek, Emma Creeks (West, the largest, Middle, and East) run through the township.

References

Further reading

External links
 Harvey County Website
 City-Data.com
 Harvey County Maps: Current, Historic, KDOT

Townships in Harvey County, Kansas
Townships in Kansas